The 1922–23 season was Maccabi Tel Aviv's 17th season since its establishment in 1906. As the local football association wasn't founded until July 1928, there were no officially organized competitions during the season, and the club played only friendly matches.

Overview
During the season, the club took part in the main cup competition, the Palestine Cup, which was organized by the British-run Jerusalem Sports Club, losing 1–7 in the first round to No. 14 Squadron RAF, who went on to win the cup. The management of the club created a separate cup competition which was called "The Hebrew Cup", and entered its B team, which were beaten in the quarter finals by Ayala Tel Aviv. After the successful completion of the cup, the club management organized a league competition with 7 clubs joining Maccabi Tel Aviv which was called Mis'chaki HaBechora (lit. The Premier Games), The league was completed during the following season.

Known Matches

Palestine Cup

The Hebrew Cup
Maccabi Tel Aviv entered it B team to the competition.

Mis'chakei HaBechora

Table (as of 21 July 1923)

Matches

Known friendly matches

References

Maccabi Tel Aviv F.C. seasons
Maccabi Tel Aviv